The 2018 Sud Ladies Cup was an international association football tournament held in Provence-Alpes-Côte d'Azur, France. The four national teams involved in the tournament were required to register a squad of 22 players; only players in these squads were eligible to take part in the tournament.

France 
Head coach:  Gilles Eyquem

Germany 
Head coach:  Maren Meinert

Haiti 
Head coach:  Marc Collat

United States 
Head coach:  Jitka Klimková

References

Sud Ladies Cup squads
Sud Ladies Cup